Tommy Heffernan is an Irish sportsperson.  He plays hurling with his local club Nenagh Éire Óg and with the Tipperary senior inter-county team since 2017.

Career
Heffernan was named in the Tipperary squad for the 2017 National Hurling League and made his league debut on 26 March when he started against Cork.

References

External links
Tipperary GAA Player Profile

Tipperary inter-county hurlers
Nenagh Éire Óg hurlers
Living people
Year of birth missing (living people)